Athinaio (before 1928) is a village and a community in the municipal unit of Valtetsi, Arcadia, Greece. It is situated on a hillside, north of the river Alfeios. iN 2011 Athinaio had a population of 82 for the village and 95 for the community, which includes the village Marmaria. Athinaio is 2 km southwest of Asea, 10 km east of Megalopoli and 16 km southwest of Tripoli. The Moreas Motorway (Corinth - Tripoli - Kalamata) passes south of the village.

Population

Notable people
Kostas Triantafyllopoulos, actor

See also
List of settlements in Arcadia

External links
 Athinaio on the GTP Travel Pages

References

Valtetsi
Populated places in Arcadia, Peloponnese